Jokhow Panom "JT" Thor (born August 26, 2002) is a South Sudanese-American professional basketball player for the Charlotte Hornets of the National Basketball Association (NBA). He played college basketball for the Auburn Tigers. He was selected with the 37th overall pick in the 2021 NBA draft.

Early life and high school career
Thor was born in Omaha, Nebraska to South Sudanese parents and moved to Anchorage, Alaska at age five. He started playing basketball in seventh grade and competed for West Anchorage High School in Anchorage, Alaska. At age 14, Thor moved to West Virginia, where his brother lived, to attend Huntington Prep School. After two seasons, he transferred to Norcross High School in Norcross, Georgia. He reclassified to the 2020 class. As a senior, Thor averaged 14.9 points and 6.6 rebounds per game, receiving all-state honors. He was a consensus four-star recruit and committed to playing college basketball for Auburn, choosing the Tigers over Oklahoma State.

College career
On February 13, 2021, Thor recorded a freshman season-high 24 points and nine rebounds, shooting 5-of-6 from three-point range, in an 82–80 loss to Kentucky. As a freshman at Auburn, he averaged 9.4 points, five rebounds and 1.4 blocks per game. On March 23, 2021, Thor declared for the 2021 NBA draft while maintaining his college eligibility. He later signed with an agent, forgoing his remaining eligibility.

Professional career

Charlotte Hornets (2021–present) 
Thor was selected 37th overall by the Detroit Pistons in the 2021 NBA draft. On August 6, he was traded to the Charlotte Hornets with Mason Plumlee for the 57th overall pick. The Hornets officially signed Thor on August 6, 2021. On October 26 and November 2, he was assigned to the Greensboro Swarm of the NBA G League. In his G League debut, Thor posted 34 points off of 14-22 shooting and 12 rebounds in a 128–117 loss to the Birmingham Squadron.

Career statistics

NBA

|-
| style="text-align:left;"| 
| style="text-align:left;"| Charlotte
| 33 || 0 || 7.9 || .436 || .259 || .600 || 1.3 || .6 || .2 || .3 || 2.0
|- class="sortbottom"
| style="text-align:center;" colspan="2"| Career
| 33 || 0 || 7.9 || .436 || .259 || .600 || 1.3 || .6 || .2 || .3 || 2.0

College

|-
| style="text-align:left;"| 2020–21
| style="text-align:left;"| Auburn
| 27 || 27 || 23.0 || .440 || .297 || .741 || 5.0 || .9 || .8 || 1.4 || 9.4

Personal life
Thor's older cousin, Jal Rial, played basketball for Phoenix College and Howard College. He has four brothers and three sisters.

References

External links
Auburn Tigers bio

2002 births
Living people
American men's basketball players
American people of South Sudanese descent
American sportspeople of African descent
Sportspeople of South Sudanese descent
Auburn Tigers men's basketball players
Basketball players from Alaska
Basketball players from Nebraska
Charlotte Hornets players
Detroit Pistons draft picks
Greensboro Swarm players
Norcross High School alumni
Power forwards (basketball)
Sportspeople from Anchorage, Alaska
Sportspeople from Omaha, Nebraska